Samina is a feminine given name that may derive from Arabic or Hebrew. The Hebrew derivation has numerous variants and is popular in Scandinavian countries.

Politicians
Samina Abid, Pakistani politician
Samina Khalid Ghurki (born 1956), Pakistani politician
Samina Khan (born 1970), Pakistani politician
Samina Matloob, Pakistani politician
Samina Noor (born 1986), Pakistani politician
Samina Mushtaq Pagganwala, Pakistani politician

Art and literature
Samina Ahmad (born 1950), Pakistani actress, director and producer
Samina Ali, American author
Samina Awan (born 1985), British actress
Samina Chowdhury, Bangladeshi singer
Samina Peerzada (born 1955), Pakistani actress, director and producer
Samina Quraeshi (1944-2013), American writer
Samina Raja (1961–2012), Pakistani poet
Samina Humayun Saeed, Pakistani producer
Samina Syed (1944-2016), Pakistani singer

Other
Samina Baig (born 1990), Pakistani mountaineer
Samina Malik, British terrorist
Samina Yasmeen, Australian academic

References

See also

Samin (name)

Arabic feminine given names
Hebrew feminine given names